Sunbus Rockhampton previously Capricorn Sunbus was the principal bus operator in Rockhampton, Queensland operating services under the QConnect scheme in Regional Queensland. It was one of Sunbus' operations. As of 2022 Sunbus has changed its name as part of a business re-brand by the parent company, Kinetic. Sunbus has now been dissolved into the Kinetic brand with its fleet of buses reflecting this change.

History
In May 1995, Harry Blundred, the proprietor of Thames Transit in the United Kingdom, commenced operating the route services in Rockhampton formerly operated by Rockhampton City Council. Initially branded Rocky transit it was later renamed Capricorn Sunbus.

As part of the deal, Sunbus was also responsible for the operation of school bus services in the region, however these were sold in 1997 to fellow British bus operator Stagecoach.

In April 2008, Blundred sold Capricorn Sunbus along with the other Sunbus operations to Transit Australia Group.

In April 2019, Transit Australia Group was purchased by AATS Group, parent company of Skybus and majority owned by OPTrust. In August 2019, AATS Group was rebranded the Kinetic Group.

In late 2022, Sunbus was officially branded as KINETIC with all new advertising now showing the Kinetic Brand. All new buses will display the Kinetic logo with the current fleet of Sunbus slowly being updated to reflect the new brand name. The current website for Sunbus will stay active until early 2023 before it will be deactivated, directing customers to the new Kinetic website.

Service Area
Sunbus operates routes in most Rockhampton suburbs including the northern suburb of Parkhurst, the eastern suburbs of Lakes Creek and Koongal, the southern suburbs of The Range and Allenstown and the western suburb of West Rockhampton. The area with the best service coverage is the busy North Rockhampton arterial road Musgrave Street in North Rockhampton.  The Sunbus depot is located in the suburb of Kawana.

Fleet
As of June 2013, the fleet consisted of 17 buses, primarily Bustech MDis and XDis. The fleet livery is light blue. It commenced operations with a fleet of ex Public Transport Corporation Ansair bodied Volvo B59s. These were replaced by a fleet of Mercedes-Benz Varios.

See also
QConnect

References

Bus companies of Queensland
Kinetic Group companies
Rockhampton
Transport companies established in 1995
1995 establishments in Australia